Silumina is a Sinhala language weekly newspaper in Sri Lanka. It is published by the Associated Newspapers of Ceylon Limited (Lake House), a government-owned corporation. The newspaper commenced publishing in March 30 1930, D. R. Wijewardena being its founder. It currently has a circulation of 265,000. Famous novelists like Martin Wickramasinghe have served as its editor.
Since 20th January 2020, Silumina Editor is Dharman Wickramaratne.

See also
List of newspapers in Sri Lanka

References

External links
Silumina official website

Associated Newspapers of Ceylon Limited
Newspapers established in 1930
Sinhala-language newspapers published in Sri Lanka
Sunday newspapers published in Sri Lanka